"PSI-missing" is the sixth single released by the J-pop singer, Mami Kawada. This single was released on October 29, 2008, one year after the release of her fifth single, "Joint". The song was used as the first opening theme for the anime series A Certain Magical Index.

The B-side  was used as an insert song on the twelfth episode of A Certain Magical Index.

The single came in a limited CD+DVD edition (GNCV-0009) and a regular CD edition (GNCV-0010). The DVD contains the promotional video for "PSI-missing".

Track listing 
PSI-missing—4:23
Composition: Tomoyuki Nakazawa
Arrangement: Tomoyuki Nakazawa, Takeshi Ozaki
Lyrics: Mami Kawada
Ame—4:40
Composition: Tomoyuki Nakazawa
Arrangement by: Tomoyuki Nakazawa, Takeshi Ozaki
Lyrics: Mami Kawada
PSI-missing (instrumental) -- 4:23
Ame (instrumental) -- 4:36

Reception
It peak ranked 14th on the weekly Oricon albums chart and remained on the chart for fourteen weeks.

References

A Certain Magical Index music
2008 singles
2008 songs
Mami Kawada songs
Anime songs
Songs with lyrics by Mami Kawada
Song recordings produced by I've Sound